The 1953–54 Oberliga  was the ninth season of the Oberliga, the first tier of the football league system in West Germany and the Saar Protectorate. The league operated in five regional divisions, Berlin, North, South, Southwest and West. The five league champions and the runners-up from the south then entered the 1954 German football championship which was won by Hannover 96. It was Hannover's second national championship, having previously won it in 1938 in an epic final against FC Schalke 04 that saw two extra time games before Hannover won 4–3.

Hannover 96 equaled the Oberliga start record set in 1952–53 by 1. FC Köln, winning its first eleven games, a mark later equaled by Hamburger SV in 1961–62 but never surpassed.

A similar-named league, the DDR-Oberliga, existed in East Germany, set at the first tier of the East German football league system. The 1953–54 DDR-Oberliga was won by Turbine Erfurt.

Oberliga Nord
The 1953–54 season saw two new clubs in the league, Eintracht Braunschweig and Victoria Hamburg, both promoted from the Amateurliga. The league's top scorer was Fritz Apel (Arminia Hannover) and Werner Heitkamp (FC St. Pauli) with 21 goals each. Hannover 96 became the only team other than Hamburger SV to win the Oberliga Nord as the latter won 15 of the possible 16 league championships from 1947 to 1963 but missed out in 1953–54.

Oberliga Berlin
The 1953–54 season saw two new clubs in the league, Kickers 1900 Berlin and Hertha Zehlendorf, both promoted from the Amateurliga Berlin. The league's top scorer was Hermann Paul of Berliner SV 1892 with 19 goals.

Oberliga West
The 1953–54 season saw two new clubs in the league, Rheydter SV and VfL Bochum, both promoted from the 2. Oberliga West. The league's top scorer was Hans Schäfer of 1. FC Köln with 26 goals.

Oberliga Südwest
The 1953–54 season saw two new clubs in the league, ASV Landau and VfR Frankenthal, both promoted from the 2. Oberliga Südwest. The league's top scorer was Herbert Martin of 1. FC Saarbrücken with 35 goals, the highest total for any scorer in the five Oberligas in 1953–54.

Oberliga Süd
The 1953–54 season saw two new clubs in the league, Jahn Regensburg and KSV Hessen Kassel, both promoted from the 2. Oberliga Süd. The league's top scorer was Helmut Preisendörfer (Kickers Offenbach) and Horst Schade (1. FC Nürnberg) with 22 goals each.

German championship

The 1954 German football championship was contested by the six qualified Oberliga teams and won by Hannover 96, defeating 1. FC Kaiserslautern in the final. The six clubs played single round of matches at neutral grounds in two groups of three. The two group winners then advanced to the final.

Group 1

Group 2

Final

References

Sources
 30 Jahre Bundesliga  30th anniversary special, publisher: kicker Sportmagazin, published: 1993
 kicker-Almanach 1990  Yearbook of German football, publisher: kicker Sportmagazin, published: 1989, 
 DSFS Liga-Chronik seit 1945  publisher: DSFS, published: 2005
 100 Jahre Süddeutscher Fußball-Verband  100 Years of the Southern German Football Federation, publisher: SFV, published: 1997

External links
 The Oberligas on Fussballdaten.de 

1953-54
1
Ger